Wingfield is a ward in the Metropolitan Borough of Rotherham, South Yorkshire, England.  The ward contains eleven listed buildings that are recorded in the National Heritage List for England.  All the listed buildings are designated at Grade II, the lowest of the three grades, which is applied to "buildings of national importance and special interest".  The ward is to the north of the centre of Rotherham, and includes the suburb of Greasbrough and the surrounding area.  The listed buildings consist of houses, farmhouses, farm buildings, a church, and a war memorial.


Buildings

References

Citations

Sources

 

Lists of listed buildings in South Yorkshire
Buildings and structures in Rotherham